Cornu aspersum (syn. Cryptomphalus aspersus), known by the common name garden snail, is a species of land snail in the family Helicidae, which includes some of the most familiar land snails. Of all terrestrial molluscs, this species may well be the most widely known. It was classified under the name Helix aspersa for over two centuries, but the prevailing classification now places it in the genus Cornu.

The snail is relished as a food item in some areas, but it is also widely regarded as a pest in gardens and in agriculture, especially in regions where it has been introduced accidentally, and where snails are not usually considered to be a menu item.

Description

The shell is variable in coloring and shade of color, but generally it has a reticulated pattern of dark brown, brownish-golden, or chestnut with yellow stripes, flecks, or streaks (characteristically interrupted brown colour bands). The aperture is large and characteristically oblique, its margin in adults is whitish and reflected.

The body is soft and slimy, brownish-grey, and able to be retracted entirely into the shell, which the animal does when inactive or threatened. When injured or badly irritated the snail produces a defensive froth of mucus that might repel some enemies or overwhelm aggressive small ants and the like. It has no operculum; during dry or cold weather it seals the aperture of the shell with a thin membrane of dried mucus; the term for such a membrane is epiphragm. The epiphragm helps the snail retain moisture and protects it from small predators such as some ants.

The snail's quiescent periods during heat and drought are known as aestivation; its quiescence during winter is known as overwintering. During aestivation, the mantle collar has the ability to change its permeability to water. The snail also has an osmoregulatory mechanism that prevents excessive absorption of water during hibernation. These mechanisms allow Cornu aspersum to avoid either fatal desiccation or hydration during months of either kind of quiescence.

During times of activity the snail's head and "foot" emerge. The head bears four tentacles; the upper two are larger and bear eye-like light sensors, and the lower two are tactile and olfactory sense organs. The snail extends the tentacles by internal pressure of body fluids, and retracts all four tentacles into the head by invagination when threatened or otherwise retreating into its shell. The mouth is located beneath the tentacles, and contains a chitinous radula with which the snail scrapes and manipulates food particles.

The shell of Cornu aspersum is almost always right-coiled, but exceptional left-coiled specimens are also known; see Jeremy (snail) for an example.

Taxonomy
The accepted name of the species was long considered to be Helix aspersa, a member of the genus Helix. However, in a number of publications since 1990, it has instead been placed in various genera previously considered as subgenera of Helix. One such genus is Cornu, which is appropriate if the species is considered as congeneric with the species previously known as Helix aperta. Then the name would be Cornu aspersum. Previously there was debate whether Cornu was a valid generic name (because it was first applied to teratological specimens), but a 2015 ruling has confirmed that it is so. Until this was established, Italian research teams and others used the generic name Cantareus instead.  Other workers, including Ukrainian and Russian research teams, who regard H. aspersa and H. aperta as being in different genera, call the former Cryptomphalus aspersus. It also still remains an arguable position to retain Helix as the generic name.

Many subspecific varieties have been described on the basis of shell characters (e.g.). The most prominent example nowadays is the subspecies Cornu aspersum maximum (Taylor, 1883), originally described as a large shelled form from Algeria (but perhaps including similar forms from elsewhere). In the recent scientific literature the name has been applied both to large Algerian snails and to a large form found in snail farms. Some Algerian forms are indeed genetically quite distant from the usual, most widespread form, but the large form in snail farms is different again. It is also problematic that there was a prior use of the name Helix aspersa maxima unassociated with Algeria. The subspecies maximum is formally considered by some authorities as a junior synonym of Cornu aspersum.

Life cycle

Like other Pulmonata, individuals are hermaphrodites, producing both male and female gametes. Reproduction is predominantly, and probably exclusively, by outcrossing.  During a mating session of several hours, two snails exchange sperm reciprocally. Cornu aspersum is one of the species that uses love darts during mating. Individuals mate repeatedly between oviposition events and can store viable allosperm for 4 years.

About 10 days after fertilisation, the snail lays a batch of on average 50 spherical pearly-white eggs into crevices in the topsoil, or sheltered under stones or the like. In a year it may lay approximately six batches of eggs. The size of the egg is 3 mm.

In captivity snails can become sexually mature within 3.5 months of hatching, before they stop growing.

Distribution

Cornu aspersum is native to the Mediterranean region and its present range stretches from northwest Africa and Iberia, eastwards to Asia Minor and Egypt,<ref>Commonwealth of Australia. 2002 (April) [http://www.daff.gov.au/__data/assets/pdf_file/0015/24702/fin_egyptian_citrus.pdf Citrus Imports from the Arab Republic of Egypt. A Review Under Existing Import Conditions for Citrus from Israel] . Agriculture, Fisheries and Forestry, Australia. Caption: Gastropods, page 12 and Appendix 2.</ref> and northwards to Britain.Cornu aspersum is a typically anthropochorous species; it has been spread to many geographical regions by humans, either deliberately or accidentally. Nowadays it is cosmopolitan in temperate zones, and has become naturalised in regions with climates that differ from the mediterranean climate in which it evolved.Pfleger, V. & Chatfield, J. (1983). A guide to snails of Britain and Europe. Hamlyn, London. Its passive anthropochory is the likeliest explanation for genetic resemblances between allopatric populations. Its anthropochorous spread may have started as early as during the Neolithic revolution some 8500 BP. Such anthropochory continues, sometimes resulting in locally catastrophic destruction of habitat or crops.

Its increasing non-native distribution includes parts of Europe, such as Bohemia in the Czech Republic since 2008. It is present in Australia, New Zealand, North America, Costa Rica  and southern South America. It was introduced to Southern Africa as a food animal by Huguenots in the 18th century, and into California as a food animal in the 1850s; it is now a notorious agricultural pest in both regions, especially in citrus groves and vineyards. Many jurisdictions have quarantines for preventing the importation of the snail in plant matter.

A number of North African endemic forms and subspecies have been described on the basis of shell characters. Cornu aspersum aspersum, in French commonly called the "petit gris", is native to the Mediterranean area and Western Europe, but has been spread widely elsewhere. The name Cornu aspersum maximum has been applied to a large form kept in heliculture (in French commonly called the "gros gris"), but this is genetically distinct from large Algerian forms earlier given this name.

EcologyCornu aspersum is a primarily a herbivore. It feeds on numerous types of fruit trees, vegetable crops, rose bushes, garden flowers, and cereals. It also is an omnivorous scavenger that will feed on rotting plant material and on occasion scavenge animal matter, such as crushed snails and worms. Cornu aspersum can obtain the calcium required to build its shell by consuming soil.  In turn it is a food source for many other animals, including small mammals, some bird species, lizards, frogs, centipedes, predatory insects such as glowworms in the family Lampyridae, and predatory terrestrial snails.
The species may be of use as an indicator of environmental pollution, because it deposits heavy metals, such as lead, in its shell.

Parasites
Parasites of Cornu aspersum  include a number of nematodes. Metacercariae of various species of the digenean genus Brachylaima have also been reported, and those have potential for being harmful to people because the adults can infect humans. However, the snails are capable of trapping cercariae (trematode larvae) in their shell, thus possibly reducing the intensity of infestation by parasites.

Behavior

The snail secretes thixotropic adhesive mucus that permits locomotion by rhythmic waves of contraction passing forward within its muscular foot. Starting from the rear, the contraction of the longitudinal muscle fibres above a small area of the film of mucus causes shear that liquefies the mucus, permitting the tip of the tail to move forward. The contracted muscle relaxes while its immediately anteriad transverse band of longitudinal fibres contract in their turn, repeating the process, which continues forward until it reaches the head. At that point the whole animal has moved forward by the length of the contraction of one of the bands of contraction. However, depending on the length of the animal, several bands of contraction can be in progress simultaneously, so that the resultant speed amounts to the speed imparted by a single wave, multiplied by the number of individual waves passing along simultaneously.

A separate type of wave motion that may be visible from the side enables the snail to conserve mucus when moving over a dry surface. It lifts its belly skin clear of the ground in arches, contacting only one to two thirds of the area it passes over. With suitable lighting the lifting may be seen from the side as illustrated, and the percentage of saving of mucus may be estimated from the area of wet mucus trail dabs that it leaves behind. This type of wave passes backwards at the speed of the snail's forward motion, therefore having a zero velocity with respect to the ground.

The snail moves at a top speed of 1.3 centimetres per second (47 meters per hour or ~50 yards per hour), and has a strong homing instinct, readily returning to a regular hibernation site.

Human relevance

The species is known as an agricultural and garden pest, an edible delicacy, and occasionally a household pet. In French cuisine, it is known as petit gris, and is served for instance in Escargot a la Bordelaise. Also in Lleida, a city of Catalonia, there is a gastronomic festival called L’Aplec del Caragol dedicated to this type of snail, known as bover, and attracts over 200,000 guests every year. From Crete are known a dish called "chochloi mpoumpouristoi"(snails turned upside down), the snails cooked alive in a hot pan, on a thick layer of sea salt. Other dishes with snails are snails with rosemary, etc. The practice of rearing snails for food is known as heliciculture. For purposes of cultivation, the snails are kept in a dark place in a wired cage with dry straw or dry wood. Coppiced wine-grape vines are often used for this purpose. During the rainy period the snails come out of hibernation and release most of their mucus onto the dry wood/straw. The snails are then prepared for cooking. Their texture when cooked is slightly chewy.

Approaches to snail pest control
There are a variety of snail-control measures that gardeners and farmers use in an attempt to reduce damage to valuable plants. Traditional pesticides are still used, as are many less toxic control options such as concentrated garlic or wormwood solutions. Copper metal is also a snail repellent, and thus a copper band around the trunk of a tree will prevent snails from climbing up and reaching the foliage and fruit. Caffeine has proven surprisingly toxic to snails, to the extent that spent coffee grounds (not decaffeinated) make a safe and immediately effective snail-repellant and even molluscicidal mulch for pot-plants, or for wherever else the supply is adequate.

Garden snails can be easily controlled and trapped with a simple trap created by cutting a plastic bottle in half and burying the bottom half so the top is level with the soil, then partially filling the bottle bottom with any variety of beer.  Snails are attracted to the carbohydrates and yeast in beer, and crawl into the trap and drown.  This method requires that the trap be checked every day and dead snails removed and the trap refilled with beer as it evaporates over time.  Traps should be spaced every three to four meters from one another for coverage of a large garden.

The decollate snail (Rumina decollata) will capture and eat garden snails, and because of this it has sometimes been introduced as a biological pest control agent. However, this is not without problems, as the decollate snail is just as likely to attack and devour other species of gastropods that may represent a valuable part of the native fauna of the region.

Pharmacological studiesCornu aspersum has gained some popularity as the chief ingredient in skin creams and gels (crema/gel de caracol) sold in the US. These creams are promoted as being suitable for use on wrinkles, scars, dry skin, and acne to reduce pigmentation, scarring, and wrinkles.

Secretions of Cornu aspersum produced under stress have skin-regenerative properties because of antioxidant superoxide dismutase and glutathione S-transferase (GSTs) activities. The secretions can stimulate fibroblast proliferation and rearrange the actin cytoskeleton stimulate extracellular matrix assembly and regulation of metalloproteinase activities for regeneration of wounded tissue.

The mucus of Cornu aspersum'' contains a rich source of substances that can be used to treat biotic human diseases. Nine fractions of compounds with varying molecular weight were purified from the mucus and was tested against gram-positive and gram-negative bacterial strains. Results found three fractions exhibited predominant antibacterial activity against the gram-positive strain.

References
This article incorporates CC-BY-2.0 text from reference.

Further reading
 Comment on Cornu Born, 1778 (Mollusca, Gastropoda, Pulmonata, HELICIDAE):request for a ruling on the availability of the generic name (Case 3518; see BZN 68: 97–104, 282–292; 69: 124–127, 219–221); Bulletin of Zoological Nomenclature 70(1) March 2013

External links

 Helix aspersa at Animalbase taxonomy, short description, distribution, biology, status (threats), images 
  Helix aspersa images at Encyclopedia of Life  including genitalia drawings
 brown garden snail on the UF / IFAS Featured Creatures website
 Canada Agriculture Fact Sheet
 BBC Info Page
 Extreme Close-Up Video of the North American Garden Snail
 University of California Pest Management Guidelines: Brown Garden Snail
 Video of froth protection response of Cornu aspersum
 Zachi Evenor, A video showing a garden snail (Cornu aspersum / Helix aspersa) in action, YouTube, November 9, 2013

Helicidae
Agricultural pest molluscs
Gastropods described in 1774
Taxa named by Otto Friedrich Müller
Articles containing video clips
Gastropods of Lord Howe Island
Taxobox binomials not recognized by IUCN